Metanephrops mozambicus (commonly known as the African lobster) is a species of lobster that lives around south-east of Madagascar. Previously considered to be part of the species Metanephrops andamanicus (Andaman lobster), they were re-classified as a unique species in 1990. The species is commercially trawled.

References

True lobsters
Crustaceans described in 1990